Cyperus portae-tartari is a sedge of the family Cyperaceae that is native to Australia, and found in the Northern Territory and Western Australia.

It blooms between February and March producing brown flowers.

The species was first described in 1980 by Karen Wilson.

See also
List of Cyperus species

References

Plants described in 1980
Flora of Western Australia
portae-tartari
Taxa named by Karen Louise Wilson